Lasse Trædal (1923 – 31 December 2010) was a Norwegian schoolteacher and missionary leader.

He worked as a schoolteacher in Haugesund and Ski, but was better known as the managing director of the Norwegian Mission Behind the Iron Curtain (now: the Stefanus Alliance International) from 1982 to 1989. The purpose of the organization was to spread the Christian gospel in the Eastern Bloc, working for human rights.

References

1923 births
2010 deaths
Norwegian schoolteachers
Norwegian Protestant missionaries